David Gordon Robinson McKibbin (16 June 1912 – 14 June 1991) was an Irish first-class cricketer.

Born at Comber in June 1912, McKibbin was educated at Mill School, Comber. A mainstay of the successful North Down side of the 1930s, McKibbin was selected to play one first-class match for Ireland against Scotland in 1937 at Belfast. Opening the batting, he scored 31 runs in Ireland's first-innings, before being dismissed by John Melville; in their second-innings he was dismissed by the same bowler for 15, with Ireland winning by 63 runs. He died at Comber in June 1991, two days short of his 79th birthday.

References

External links

1912 births
1991 deaths
People from Comber
Irish cricketers
Cricketers from Northern Ireland